Canoas, which earned city status in 1939, is a municipality in the Brazilian state of Rio Grande do Sul.  With more than 340,000 inhabitants, it is part of the Porto Alegre conurbation and has the second highest GDP in the state. It is also the fourth largest city in the state by population.  Canoas boasts a strong manufacturing-based economy and is the home to Canoas Air Force Base - ALA3, one of the most important bases of the Brazilian Air Force.

According to the IBGE, Brazil's Geography and Statistics Institute, Canoas currently has no rural areas, but it started as a village of large landowners. The first of them was conquistador Francisco Pinto Bandeira, who received from the Portuguese Crown, in 1740, an area north of the Gravataí River.

History has that 1871 was the beginning of the village of Canoas, when the first section of the railway that would link Porto Alegre to São Leopoldo was inaugurated. Canoas was then part of the municipalities of Gravataí and São Sebastião do Caí. Soon large farms would lose space to small properties.

After obtaining city status, Canoas experienced rapid growth, especially after 1945. However, de-industrialisation in Porto Alegre, the setting-up of numerous manufacturing plants in Canoas and a strong demographic growth have reverted that situation and nowadays Canoas has a per capita GDP higher than Porto Alegre.

City conditions and subdivisions 
Canoas ('canoes' in English) consists of mostly large sprawling neighborhoods and a lively business district, as well as numerous large factories, among them the Refinaria Alberto Pasqualini (REFAP), a Petrobras oil refinery.

The city's neighbourhoods follow a common pattern in Brazil, combining new high-end districts showing rapid urban development with working-class areas which turn into slums as one moves away from the city centre.

The city's poorest neighbourhoods were originally unplanned. The Guajuviras subdivision, the old Guajuviras Farm that was developed by the government, was originally settled by squatters before the government officially opened the property for inhabitation. Although traditionally crime-ridden, Guajuviras has experienced lower criminality levels as of lately due to government intervention and the better living conditions experienced by Brazilians in general.

Canoas has one of the richest and most important universities in southern Brazil: the Ulbra (Lutheran University of Brazil), as well as Catholic La Salle University (UnilaSalle) and Centro Universitário Ritter dos Reis. In sports, the volleyball team Canoas Vôlei plays in the Brazilian Superliga de Vôlei, whereas the football team Canoas Futebol Clube plays in the Campeonato Gaúcho.

Pictures of Canoas

See also 
Porto Alegre
Alvorada

External links 

 Canoas Mayoral Office (in Portuguese)
Satellite view of Canoas
 Images of the city and its History (in Portuguese) Images of homes are not representative of the rest of the city - the homes shown are part of one wealthy subdivision in the city
 SOGAL - Sociedade de Ônibus Gaúcha: Canoas City's Bus Transport (in Portuguese)
 ULBRA - Lutheran University of Brazil (in Portuguese)

References 

 
Municipalities in Rio Grande do Sul